James R. Dressler (September 18, 1932 – November 17, 2018) was an American judge and politician. He served as a Democratic member of the Florida House of Representatives, and as a member for the 37th district of the Florida Senate.

Life and career
Born in Millersburg, Pennsylvania, and was raised in Greenville, South Carolina and Jacksonville, Florida. He went to Robert E. Lee High School, graduating in 1950. He then attended University of Florida, where he earned a Bachelor of Arts degree in political science in 1953. In 1956 he received a law degree at the University of Florida Levin College of Law.

Dressler worked as a lawyer, and was appointed to serve as a judge of the Small Claims Court in 1960. In 1963, Dressler was elected to the Florida House of Representatives, then, in 1965, he was elected to represent the 37th district in the Florida Senate.

Dressler died in November 2018 at his home in Merritt Island, Florida, at the age of 86.

References 

1932 births
2018 deaths
Democratic Party Florida state senators
Democratic Party members of the Florida House of Representatives
20th-century American politicians
Florida lawyers
Florida state court judges
20th-century American judges
University of Florida alumni
Fredric G. Levin College of Law alumni